MBK Handlová is a Slovak professional basketball club, based in Handlová. The club currently plays in the Slovak Basketball League (SBL), the first tier of basketball in Slovakia.

References

External links
Official website

Basketball teams in Slovakia
Sport in Trenčín Region
Basketball in Czechoslovakia
1941 establishments in Czechoslovakia
Basketball teams established in 1941
Prievidza District